Pennsville is an unincorporated community and census-designated place (CDP) located within Pennsville Township, in Salem County, New Jersey, United States. As of the 2010 United States Census, the CDP's population was 11,888.

Geography
According to the United States Census Bureau, Pennsville had a total area of 10.422 square miles (26.993 km2), including 10.065 square miles (26.069 km2) of land and 0.357 square miles (0.924 km2) of water (3.42%).

Demographics

Census 2010

Census 2000
As of the 2000 United States Census there were 11,657 people, 4,684 households, and 3,292 families living in the CDP. The population density was 429.5/km2 (1,112.7/mi2). There were 4,930 housing units at an average density of 181.6/km2 (470.6/mi2). The racial makeup of the CDP was 97.11% White, 0.68% African American, 0.16% Native American, 0.88% Asian, 0.02% Pacific Islander, 0.38% from other races, and 0.77% from two or more races. 1.59% of the population were Hispanic or Latino of any race.

There were 4,684 households, out of which 29.8% had children under the age of 18 living with them, 55.8% were married couples living together, 10.4% had a female householder with no husband present, and 29.7% were non-families. 25.4% of all households were made up of individuals, and 11.6% had someone living alone who was 65 years of age or older. The average household size was 2.49 and the average family size was 2.98.

In the CDP the population was spread out, with 23.3% under the age of 18, 7.9% from 18 to 24, 28.3% from 25 to 44, 25.3% from 45 to 64, and 15.2% who were 65 years of age or older. The median age was 39 years. For every 100 females, there were 92.1 males. For every 100 females age 18 and over, there were 89.8 males.

The median income for a household in the CDP was $47,494, and the median income for a family was $57,290. Males had a median income of $46,157 versus $29,818 for females. The per capita income for the CDP was $22,522. 5.1% of the population and 3.4% of families were below the poverty line. Out of the total people living in poverty, 5.3% are under the age of 18 and 4.7% are 65 or older.

References

Census-designated places in Salem County, New Jersey
Pennsville Township, New Jersey